Jan Šeda (born April 11, 1985) is a Czech former professional ice hockey player who last played for Naprzod Janow in the Polska Hokej Liga. He previously played with HC Pardubice in the Czech Extraliga during the 2010–11 Czech Extraliga season.

Career statistics

References

External links 
 
 

1985 births
Living people
Czech ice hockey centres
HC Chrudim players
HC Dynamo Pardubice players
Naprzód Janów players
Orli Znojmo players
Sportspeople from Pardubice
Stadion Hradec Králové players
Czech expatriate ice hockey people
Czech expatriate sportspeople in Poland
Expatriate ice hockey players in  Poland